Gaspare Ricciullo del Fosso, O.M. (1496–1592) was a Roman Catholic prelate who served as Archbishop of Reggio Calabria (1560–1592),
Bishop of Calvi Risorta (1551–1560),
and Bishop of Scala (1548–1551).

Biography
Gaspare Ricciullo del Fosso was born in Rogliano, Italy on 6 January 1496 and ordained a priest in the Order of the Minims in November 1521.
On 17 May 1548, he was appointed during the papacy of Pope Paul III as Bishop of Scala.
On 22 April 1551, he was appointed during the papacy of Pope Julius III as Bishop of Calvi Risorta.
On 17 July 1560, he was appointed during the papacy of Pope Pius IV as Archbishop of Reggio Calabria.
He served as Archbishop of Reggio Calabria until his death on 28 December 1592.

References

External links and additional sources
 (for Chronology of Bishops) 
 (for Chronology of Bishops) 
 (for Chronology of Bishops) 
 (for Chronology of Bishops) 
 (for Chronology of Bishops) 
 (for Chronology of Bishops) 

Minims (religious order)

16th-century Italian Roman Catholic bishops
Bishops appointed by Pope Paul III
Bishops appointed by Pope Julius III
Bishops appointed by Pope Pius IV
1496 births
1592 deaths
16th-century Italian Roman Catholic archbishops